Enrique Luis Mendizábal Raig (25 August 1918 – 18 November 2017) was a Peruvian sport shooter who competed in the 1948 Summer Olympics.

References

1918 births
2017 deaths
Peruvian male sport shooters
Olympic shooters of Peru
Shooters at the 1948 Summer Olympics
Sportspeople from Lima